62 Aurigae is a star located 559 light years away from the Sun in the northern constellation of Auriga. It is visible to the naked eye as a dim, orange-hued star with an apparent visual magnitude of 6.02. This object is moving further from the Earth with a heliocentric radial velocity of +25 km/s. It is an aging giant star with a stellar classification of K2 III, having exhausted the supply of hydrogen at its core then expanded to 22 times the Sun's radius. 62 Aurigae is radiating 167 times the luminosity of the Sun from its swollen photosphere at an effective temperature of 4,389 K.

References

K-type giants
Auriga (constellation)
Durchmusterung objects
Aurigae, 62
051440
033614
2600